The 2017 BYU Cougars women's soccer team represented BYU during the 2017 NCAA Division I women's soccer season. The Cougars were coached for a 23rd consecutive season by Jennifer Rockwood, who was co-coach in 1995 and became the solo head coach in 1996. Before 1995 BYU women's soccer competed as a club team and not as a member of the NCAA. The Cougars entered the 2017 season having won five consecutive West Coast Conference championships and having made the NCAA Tournament each of the last five seasons and in 18 of the 22 seasons that Rockwood has been the head coach. Joining Rockwood as assistant coaches are Brent Anderson (1st season) and Aleisha Rose (14th season) with volunteer assistants Rachel Jorgensen (4th season) and McKinzie Young (6th season). The Cougars came off of a season were they advanced to the third round of the College Cup before being defeated by South Carolina to finish the season 18–3–1. The Cougars were picked to finish second by the WCC media. After a slow start the Cougars finished the season with their first losing record since 2004 at 7–8–4 and failed to make the NCAA Playoffs for the first time since 2011. They finished the conference tied for fourth at 4–4–1.

Media

Television & Internet Streaming 
All but one BYU women's soccer had a TV broadcast or internet video stream available. BYUtv and TheW.tv served as the primary providers. Information on these television broadcasts can be found under each individual match.

Nu Skin BYU Sports Network 

For a fourth consecutive season the BYU Sports Network aired BYU Cougars women's soccer games. Greg Wrubell provided play-by-play for most games with Jason Shepherd filling-in when Wrubell had football duties. Former player Paige Hunt Barker served as the new analyst. ESPN 960 and BYU Radio acted as the flagship stations for women's soccer.

Schedule 

 *- Denotes WCC game
x- Denotes Nu Skin BYU Sports Network/ESPN 960 broadcast
y- Television Broadcast
z- Internet Stream

x-Exhibition: Blue/White Game 
Broadcasters: Greg Wrubell & Paige Barker (BYU Radio/ESPN 960)
Two 40 minute halves made up the exhibition. Coaches were also free to move players from the Blue to the White and vice versa as it was an inter-squad match.

x-Exhibition: Oklahoma 
Series History: BYU leads series 2–1–0
Broadcasters: Greg Wrubell & Paige Barker (BYU Radio/ESPN 960) 
Chris Plank (Sooner Radio Network)

xz-Penn State 
Series History: BYU leads series 2–0–0
Broadcasters: No commentary (LionVision)Greg Wrubell & Paige Barker (BYU Radio/ESPN 960)

xy-Ohio State 
Series History: BYU leads series 1–0–0
Broadcasters: Spencer Linton, Natalyn Lewis, & Lauren Francom McClain (BYUtv)Greg Wrubell & Paige Barker (BYU Radio/ESPN 960)

x-Cal State Fullerton 
Series History: BYU leads series 6–0–1
Broadcasters: Greg Wrubell & Paige Barker (BYU Radio/ESPN 960)

xy-UCLA 
Series History: BYU leads series 2–1–1
Broadcasters: Spencer Linton, Natalyn Lewis, & Lauren Francom McClain (BYUtv)Jason Shepherd & Paige Barker (BYU Radio/ESPN 960)

xy-Colorado 
Series History: BYU leads series 4–2–1
Broadcasters: Christian Miles & Krista Blunk (P12)Greg Wrubell & Paige Barker (BYU Radio/ESPN 960)

xy-Utah 
Game Name: Deseret First Duel
Series History: BYU leads series 21–7–1
Broadcasters: Spencer Linton, Natalyn Lewis, & Lauren Francom McCalin (BYUtv)Greg Wrubell & Paige Barker (BYU Radio/ESPN 960)

xy-Oregon State 
Series History: BYU leads series 2–0–0
Broadcasters: Ann Schatz & Tracey Bailey (P12)Greg Wrubell & Paige Barker (BYU Radio/ESPN 960)

xy-Arizona 
Series History: BYU leads series 11–1–0
Broadcasters: Daron Sutton (P12)Jason Shepherd & Paige Barker (BYU Radio/ESPN 960)

xy-Kansas 
Series History: BYU leads series 2–1–0
Broadcasters: Spencer Linton, Natalyn Lewis, & Lauren Francom McClain (BYUtv)Greg Wrubell & Paige Barker (BYU Radio/ESPN 960)

xy-Utah Valley 
Game Name: UCCU Crosstown Clash
Series History: BYU leads series 2–0–0
Broadcasters: Spencer Linton, Natalyn Lewis, & Lauren Francom McClain (BYUtv)Greg Wrubell & Paige Barker (BYU Radio/ESPN 960)

xy-San Diego* 
Series History: BYU leads series 7–2–0
Broadcasters: Spencer Linton & Natalyn Lewis (BYUtv)Jason Shepherd & Paige Barker (ESPN 960)

xy-Saint Mary's* 
Series History: BYU leads series 6–0–1
Broadcasters: Spencer Linton, Natalyn Lewis, & Lauren Francom McClain (BYUtv)Greg Wrubell & Paige Barker (BYU Radio/ESPN 960)

xz-Pacific* 
Series History: BYU leads series 4–1–0
Broadcasters: Robbie Bullough (TheW.tv)Greg Wrubell & Paige Barker (BYU Radio/ESPN 960)

xy- Pepperdine* 
Series History: Series even 4–4–0
Broadcasters: Spencer Linton, Natalyn Lewis, & Lauren Francom McClain (BYUtv)Greg Wrubell & Paige Barker (BYU Radio/ESPN 960)

xz- Loyola Marymount* 
Series History: BYU leads series 7–1–0
Broadcasters: Mitchell Marshall (TheW.tv) Jason Shepherd & Paige Barker (ESPN 960)

xy- Gonzaga* 
Series History: BYU leads series 9–0–0
Broadcasters: Trey Bender & Lori Lindsey (ESPNU)Greg Wrubell & Paige Barker (BYU Radio/ESPN 960)

xz- Portland* 
Series History: BYU leads series 7–4–0
Broadcasters: Adam Linnman & Noelle La Prevotte (TheW.tv)Jason Shepherd & Paige Barker (BYU Radio/ESPN 960)

xz-San Francisco* 
Originally scheduled for October 14, this match was postponed due to poor air quality stemming from wildfires in Northern California.
Series History: BYU leads series 6–1–0
Broadcasters: Charles Wollin (TheW.tv)Greg Wrubell & Paige Barker (BYU Radio/ESPN 960)

xz- Santa Clara* 
Series History: Santa Clara leads series 6–1–4
Broadcasters: David Gentile (TheW.tv)Greg Wrubell & Paige Barker (BYU Radio/ESPN 960)

Roster

Rankings

References 

2017 in sports in Utah
2017 West Coast Conference women's soccer season
2017 team